Jacques Perrier is the name of:
 Jacques Perrier (basketball) (born 1924), French basketball player
 Jacques Perrier (skier) (born 1929), French cross country skier